Bosea may refer to:
Bosea (bacterium), a genus of bacteria in the order Hyphomicrobiales
Bosea (plant), a genus of plants in the family Amaranthaceae
Bosea (Loan), in Ghana is the local name for loans